Vladimir Vladimirovich Kapustin (born 7 June 1960) is a former Soviet and Russian professional football player, currently working as an assistant coach for the Swedish Division 2 (fourth-tier league) club FC Gute.

Honours
 Soviet Top League champion: 1987, 1989.
 Soviet Top League runner-up: 1985.
 Soviet Top League bronze: 1986.
 USSR Federation Cup winner: 1987.

European club competitions
With FC Spartak Moscow.

 1986–87 UEFA Cup: 4 games.
 1987–88 UEFA Cup: 2 games.
 1988–89 European Cup: 2 games.
 1989–90 UEFA Cup: 1 game.

External links
 

1960 births
Footballers from Moscow
Living people
Soviet footballers
Russian footballers
Association football midfielders
Soviet expatriate footballers
Russian expatriate footballers
Expatriate footballers in Sweden
FC Dynamo Moscow players
FC Spartak Moscow players
Soviet Top League players